Puka Qaqa (Quechua puka red, qaqa rock, "red rock", Hispanicized spelling Pucaccaca) is a  mountain in the Cordillera Negra in the Andes of Peru. It is situated in the Ancash Region, Recuay Province, on the border of the districts of Huayllapampa and Marca. Puka Qaqa lies southwest of Qulluta and Minas Hirka.

References

External links 

Mountains of Peru
Mountains of Ancash Region